Prince Edward Road East and Prince Edward Road West are roads in Kowloon, Hong Kong, going in an east-west direction and linking Tai Kok Tsui, Mong Kok, Kowloon Tong, Kowloon City and San Po Kong (outside the retired Kai Tak Airport).

The roads were named after Prince Edward in 1922, later Edward VIII (later The Duke of Windsor), after his visit to Hong Kong.

Prince Edward station and the Prince Edward area in Hong Kong are both named after Prince Edward Road, rather than Prince Edward himself.

Prince Edward Road 
In the beginning of the 1920s, the Hong Kong government was developing the Mong Kok district and decided to build a road connecting this to Kowloon City. In April 1922, Prince Edward (later Edward VIII) came to Hong Kong and visited the construction of this road. Due to this visit, the government named this road Prince Edward Road. In the 1930s, Prince Edward Road was extended to the area of Ngau Chi Wan. During Japanese occupation, the road was renamed as Kashima-dori (鹿島通り).

Prince Edward Road West 

Prince Edward Road West is a road between Tai Kok Tsui, Mong Kok, Kowloon Tong and Kowloon City. This road was originally named Edward Avenue before 1924. It was later renamed Prince Edward Road in 1924, and in 1958 the Chinese name was changed from what was literally "British Royal Prince Road" to a new name that is literally "Crown Prince Road" . In 1979, it became the Prince Edward Road West.

Prince Edward Road West starts from Kowloon City where it succeeds Prince Edward Road East. It runs across Kowloon City and Prince Edward, and ends at Tai Kok Tsui at an intersection with Tong Mi Road and West Kowloon Corridor.

It is worth noting that the section of Prince Edward Road West from Olympic Garden to Nathan Road runs unidirectionally from east to west. Boundary Street serves as its complement by providing a nearby route which runs from west to east.

Prince Edward Road East 
Prince Edward Road East is a road between Kowloon City and San Po Kong. It was originally the Sai Kung Road and later part of the Clear Water Bay Road. It later became part of the Prince Edward Road. In 1979, it became the Prince Edward Road East.

The modern Prince Edward Road East starts from Choi Hung Interchange, where it meets Clear Water Bay Road to the northeast and Kwun Tong Road to the southeast. Then it goes west along the boundary between San Po Kong and the retired Kai Tak Airport, and finally ends at Olympic Garden in Kowloon City, where it branches into three roads, Ma Tau Chung Road, Argyle Street and Prince Edward Road West.

Prince Edward Road East was once misspelled as "Princess Edward Road East" by MTR Corporation in the map describing Sha Tin to Central Link (from Diamond Hill station to Kai Tak).

Notable places along the road 

 Diocesan Boys' School
 Mong Kok Stadium
 Kowloon Hospital
 St. Teresa's Church (#258)
 St. Teresa's Hospital (#327)
 Olympic Garden
 Former Kai Tak Airport
 Prince Edward station
 Mikiki
 Kowloon Walled City, demolished in the 1990s

Events 
On 9 May 2005, a dozen stacks of shelving on a construction site next to the road fell off due to adverse weather conditions. The relevant section of the road was closed, leading to a severe disruption of traffic among East Kowloon, and affecting more than 100,000 people.

See also 
 Prince Edward, Hong Kong
 List of streets and roads in Hong Kong

References

External links 

Roads in Kowloon
Tai Kok Tsui
Mong Kok
Ho Man Tin
Kowloon City
San Po Kong
Ngau Chi Wan